The 2013–14 Amkar Perm season was their 10th season in the Russian Premier League, the highest tier of association football in Russia, following promotion during the 2003 season. They were knocked out of the Russian Cup at the Round of 32 stage by Mordovia Saransk.

Squad

Transfers

Summer

In:

 

Out:

Winter

In:

Out:

Competitions

Russian Premier League

Matches

Table

Russian Cup

Squad statistics

Appearances and goals

|-
|colspan="14"|Players who left Amkar Perm on loan:

|-
|colspan="14"|Players who left Amkar Perm during the season:

|}

Top scorers

Disciplinary record

References

FC Amkar Perm seasons
Amkar Perm